Lazers Not Included is the debut studio album by British drum and bass record producer Wilkinson. The album was released on 28 October 2013 through RAM Records under license to Virgin EMI. The album includes the singles "Tonight", "Need to Know", "Take You Higher", "Heartbeat", "Afterglow", "Too Close" and "Half Light". The album has peaked at number 46 on the UK Albums Chart.

An extended edition was released on 20 October 2014. It features the UK number 20 single "Dirty Love", alongside remixes of and by Wilkinson. Notably, "Direction VIP" was previously only available on Record Store Day vinyl before appearing on the album.

Singles
 The first single from the album "Need to Know" features vocals from London-based singer Iman and was released on 2 December 2012, almost a year after "Tonight". A B-side to the song titled "Direction" was also released. The song received widespread airplay and managed to chart at number 195 on the UK Singles Chart, number 39 on the UK Dance Chart and in Belgium at number 55 in the Ultratip Flanders chart.
 The second single from the album "Take You Higher" was released on 24 March 2013, alongside the B-side "Crunch" and remixes from Jakwob and Foamo. The song has peaked at number 35 on the UK Dance Chart, yet unlike its previous single, the song failed to make an appearance on the UK Singles Chart. Although, the song has also charted in the UK Indie Chart and in Belgium.
 The album's third single "Heartbeat" features vocals from British rapper P Money and English singer Arlissa. It was released on 26 July 2013 alongside remixes from Calyx, Teebee, Mind Vortex, Torqux and the instrumental edit. The song received widespread recognition and helped expose Wilkinson to a larger audience, partly thanks to frequent airplay and P Money's fanbase. It was named as one of Zane Lowe's Hottest Records in the World on BBC Radio 1. The song entered the UK Singles Chart at number 169 and the UK Dance Chart at number 36.
 "Afterglow" is the album's fourth single and Wilkinson's breakthrough song. It features uncredited vocals from Becky Hill and was released on 13 October 2013, entering the UK Singles Chart at number 8. It also topped the UK Dance Chart. The vinyl release was accompanied by the B-side "Perforation", and the digital download was accompanied by remixes from Cyantific, Dyro, Cutline and DEVolution.
 "Too Close" was released on 23 February 2014 as the album's fifth single, backed by "Midnight" on the vinyl release. It features vocals by Detour City. The digital download features the VIP mix and remixes by Wookie, Catching Flies, Frankee and Askery. The song features vocals from Detour City. It peaked at number 55 on the UK Singles Chart and number 14 on the UK Dance Chart.
 "Half Light" was released as the album's sixth single on 1 June 2014. It features vocals from Tom Cane. The song peaked at number 25 on the UK Singles Chart.
 "Dirty Love" was released on October 10 as the album's seventh single, and the first from the album's extended edition. The song features vocals from British singer Talay Riley. It peaked at number 20 on the UK Singles Chart.

Promotional singles
 The single "Tonight" was released on 4 December 2011, backed by the B-side track "Pistol Whip" which doesn't feature on the album. The song received international airplay and also gained recognition thanks to UKF Drum and Bass, accumulating over 400,000 YouTube views. "Tonight" was re-released for free as the iTunes Single of the Week on the week ending 24 November 2013. It was given alternate artwork and repackaged to promote the release of the album.

Track listing
All tracks produced by Mark Wilkinson.

Notes
 "Afterglow" features uncredited vocals by Becky Hill.
 "Need to Know" contains interpolations of "Watcha Doing Now?" (Full Intention mix) by Anthony Moriah.

Charts

Certifications

References

Wilkinson (musician) albums
2013 debut albums
RAM Records albums
Virgin EMI Records albums
Drum and bass albums